The 1823 Maine gubernatorial election took place on September 8, 1823. Incumbent Democratic-Republican Governor Albion Parris won re-election to a third term.

Results

References

Gubernatorial
1823
Maine
September 1823 events